The Massey-Harris Model 81 was a two-plow small-farm tractor built by Massey-Harris (later Massey Ferguson) from 1941-1948. Introduced to replace Massey's General GG, the 81 was paired with the Model 82 (which used kerosene, or tractor vaporizing oil {TVO}, as it was known in Britain) and was very similar to the Model 101 Junior, which first appeared in 1939. It was offered in standard-tread and row-crop versions, as was the Model 20 that followed it. The Model 81 was joined in 1946 by the Model 20, both of which survived in production until 1948.

Pricing
With a base price of around C$800, it was competitive with the C$900 John Deere A. and less than Ford and Ferguson-Brown models of the period.

Weight
The bare weight without ballast was 2,600 lb (1,170 kg), some 1,100 lb {580 kg} less than the contemporary Model 30.

Engines
The 81 used the same 124 in3 (2,031 cc) engine of the 101 Junior, while the 82 used a 140 in3 (2,293 cc) model. The 124 in3 was rated at 21 hp (15.7 kW) at the belt, and was manufactured by Continental, like all Massey-Harris tractors at the time.

Use by Royal Canadian Air Force
The Royal Canadian Air Force used blue-painted standards as aircraft tugs, out of under 2,600 standard-tread 81s made.

References

Sources

Further reading
Pripps, Robert N. The Big Book of Farm Tractors. Vancouver, BC: Raincoast Books, 2001. .
__. The Field Guide to Vintage Farm Tractors. Stillwater, MN: Voyageur Press, 2001.
__. Vintage Ford Tractors. Stillwater, MN: Voyageur Press, 2001.
Denison, Merrill. Harvest Triumphant: The Story of Massey-Harris. New York: Dodd Mead, 1949.
Farnsworth, John. The Massey Legacy. Ipswich, Great Britain: Farming Press, 1997.
Gay, Larry. Farm Tractors 1975-1995. Saint Joseph, MI: American Society of Agricultural Engineers, 1995.
Wendel, C. H. Massey Tractors. Osceola, WI: Motorbooks International, 1992.

Tractors
Massey-Harris vehicles